Nobody's Fool is a 1921 American silent comedy film written and directed by King Baggot and starring Marie Prevost, Helen Harris and Vernon Snively.

Cast
 Marie Prevost as Polly Gordon 
 Helen Harris as Mary Hardy 
 Vernon Snively as Vincent DePuyster 
 R. Henry Guy as Dr. Hardy 
 Percy Challenger as Joshua Alger 
 Harry Myers as Artemis Alger 
 George Kuwa as Ah Gone 
 Lucretia Harris as Melinda 
 Lydia Yeamans Titus as Housekeeper

References

Bibliography
 Munden, Kenneth White. The American Film Institute Catalog of Motion Pictures Produced in the United States, Part 1. University of California Press, 1997.

External links
 

1921 films
1921 comedy films
1920s English-language films
American silent feature films
Silent American comedy films
Films directed by King Baggot
American black-and-white films
Universal Pictures films
1920s American films